Donji Pustakovec is a village in Međimurje County, Croatia.

The village is part of the municipality of Donji Kraljevec and had a population of 286 in the 2011 census. It is connected with the village of Sveti Juraj u Trnju. The D3 state road passes through both villages, which are located around 15 kilometres south-east of Čakovec, the county seat and largest city of Međimurje County.

References 

Populated places in Međimurje County